Empire Baffin was a 6,978 ton cargo ship which was built by Lithgows Ltd, Port Glasgow in 1941 for the Ministry of War Transport (MoWT). She was commissioned in 1943 as HMS Sancroft, being converted into a cable laying ship for Operation Pluto. She was returned to the MoWT in 1946 and subsequently sold and renamed Clintonia. A final change of ownership in 1960 saw her renamed Aspis and she was scrapped in 1963.

History
Empire Baffin was built by Lithgows Ltd, Port Glasgow as yard number 958. She was launched on 28 August 1941 and completed in October 1941. She was operated under the management of J Robinson & Sons, North Shields.

War service
Empire Baffin was a member of a number of convoys during the Second World War.

PQ 2

Convoy PQ 2 sailed from Liverpool on 13 October 1941 and arrived at Archangel on 30 October. Empire Baffin joined from Scapa Flow on 17 October.

QP 3

Convoy QP 3 sailed from Archangel on 27 November 1941 and dispersed on 3 December. Empire Baffin was carrying a cargo of magnesite bound for the Tees.

PQ 11

Convoy PQ 11 sailed from Kirkness on 14 February 1942 and arrived at Murmansk on 22 February.

QP 9

Convoy QP 9 sailed from the Kola Inlet on 21 March 1942 and arrived at Reykjavík on 3 April. Empire Baffin was carrying a cargo of Chloride of Potassium bound for Middlesbrough.

UR 23

Convoy UR 23 sailed from Loch Ewe on 8 May 1942 and arrived at Reykjavík on 12 May.

PQ 16

Convoy PQ 16 sailed from Reykjavík on 21 May 1942 and arrived at Murmansk on 30 May. Empire Baffin was attacked by German aircraft, which bombed her scoring several near misses. Her propeller, driveshaft and bearings were damaged and she developed a leak in her stern gland. The Chief Engineer had to spend three days and nights in the shaft tunnel tending to the bearings. Empire Baffin was repaired and returned to service.

QP 13U

Convoy QP 13U sailed from Archangel on 26 June 1942 and arrived at Reykjavík on 7 July. Empire Baffin was bound for the Tyne.

PQ 18
Convoy PQ 18 sailed from Loch Ewe on 2 September 1942 and arrived at Archangel on 21 September.

QP 15

Convoy QP 15 sailed from the Kola Inlet on 17 November 1942 and arrived at Loch Ewe on 30 November.

JW 52

Convoy JW 52
sailed from Liverpool on 17 January 1943 and arrived at the Kola Inlet on 27 January.

JW 53

Convoy JW 33 sailed from Loch Ewe on 15 February 1943 and arrived at the Kola Inlet on or about 27 February. Empire Baffin had to return to Loch Ewe due to being damaged in severe weather.

SC 141

Convoy SC 151 sailed from Halifax Nova Scotia on 3 September 1943 and arrived at Liverpool on 17 September. Empire Baffin was carrying a general cargo bound for London.

Empire Baffin was taken over by the Admiralty and converted by Green & Silley Weir Ltd, London to a cable laying ship for Operation Pluto, and commissioned as HMS Sancroft. She was used in the support of Operation Overlord. Those killed whilst serving on Empire Baffin during the war are commemorated at the Tower Hill Memorial, London.

Postwar
In 1946, HMS Sancroft reverted to the MoWT and regained her Empire Baffin name. Later that year, she was sold to Stag Line Ltd, North Shields still under the management of J  Robinson & Sons. She was the fifth Stag Line ship to bear the name Clintonia. She was purchased at a cost of £30,000 and converted back to a cargo ship and also from coal to oil fuel at a cost of £137,911. On 10 December 1959, Clintonia was sold to Alcestis Shipping Co. SA, Greece for £62,500. She was renamed Apsis She was operated under the management of Faros Shipping Co Ltd, London.. Apsis served until 1963 when she was sold for scrap. She arrived at Yokosuka, Japan in December 1963 for scrapping.

Official number and code letters
Official Numbers were a forerunner to IMO Numbers.

Empire Baffin had the UK Official Number 168968 and used the Code Letters BCQR.

References

1941 ships
Ships built on the River Clyde
Steamships of the United Kingdom
Empire ships
Ministry of War Transport ships
Auxiliary ships of the Royal Navy
Operation Overlord
Merchant ships of the United Kingdom
Steamships of Greece
Merchant ships of Greece